Charles Henry Cust (27 September 1813 – 19 May 1875) was a British soldier and Conservative politician.

Background
Cust was the second son of John Cust, 1st Earl Brownlow, and his first wife Sophia, daughter of Sir Abraham Hume, 2nd Baronet. John Egerton, Viscount Alford, was his elder brother.

Military and political career
Cust was a Captain in the Royal Horse Guards. In 1859 he was appointed High Sheriff of Northamptonshire and in 1865 was returned to Parliament for Shropshire North. He held the seat only until the following year, when he was succeeded by his nephew, Adelbert Brownlow-Cust

Family
Cust married Caroline, daughter of Reginald George Macdonald, in 1842. He died in May 1875, aged 61. Caroline died in October 1887.

References

External links 
 

1813 births
1875 deaths
Younger sons of earls
High Sheriffs of Northamptonshire
Conservative Party (UK) MPs for English constituencies
UK MPs 1865–1868
Charles